Latum (also Romanized as Latūm, Latoom, Letowm, and Lotūm; also known as Letom) is a village in Yeylaqi-ye Ardeh Rural District, Pareh Sar District, Rezvanshahr County, Gilan Province, Iran. At the 2006 census, its population was 70, in 22 families.

References 

Populated places in Rezvanshahr County